Gant may refer to:

 Gant (surname)
 Gant (retailer), an international brand of clothing and accessories

Places
 Gant, Poland
 Gánt, a village in Hungary
 Gant, the Catalan name for Ghent, Belgium

Entertainment
 187 Lockdown, a 1990s British electronic duo that released under the name Gant

See also
 Arizona v. Gant, a 2008 United States Supreme Court case
 Gantt (disambiguation)
 Gantt chart, a type of time-planning chart
 Gantz (disambiguation)
 Ganz (disambiguation)
 Ganz (surname)